Amanita albocreata, also called the ringless panther or the ringless panther amanita, is a species of fungus in the family Amanitaceae. It was discovered in 1944, by William Murrill. It is commonly found in northeastern United States and southeastern Canada and elsewhere in North America. This species, that grows about 5 to 15 centimeters in length, is doubted to be fatally toxic. It normally grows between the rainy months of June and August.

Taxonomy
First described in 1902 by George Francis Atkinson under the name Amanitopsis albocreata, the species was transferred to Amanita in 1941 by Jean-Edouard Gilbert.

Description
 Cap: The lengths of the cap can vary from 2 centimeters to 5 or 8 centimeters. It can appear convex or shield-shaped. The cap's disc has been seen colored white to pale yellow, with easily removed flaky patches or warts of whitish volva remnants. The center can be tan or creamy yellow in color. Akin to its relative Amanita frostiana, the cap feels smooth and sticky when moist.
 Gills: Gills can be free or slightly adnate. They are about 3–10.5 millimeters broad, with a minutely flocculose edge. The short gills are truncate to excavate-truncate with or without an attenuate "tooth" at the juncture with the flesh of the cap. They are cream to pale cream in color.
 Stem/ Stipe: The stem, or stipe, measures 80–120 x 6–8 millimeters. It lacks a ring but consists of a volva. The notable bulb (dimensions 15–22 x 12–20 millimeters) bears a distinct white collar as do some species with annulate stems, like other Amanita species Amanita multisquamosa, Amanita velatipes and Amanita pantherina.
 Spores and microscopic features: The spores measure (7.3-) 7.7–9.5 (-11.6) x 6.6–8.4 (-9.4) µm and are globose to subglobose or occasionally broadly ellipsoid and inamyloid. Clamps are rare at bases of basidia.
 Flesh: This mushroom has thin and sticky flesh under the cap.

Distribution and habitat
This fungus is found in the hardwood-hemlock (Tsuga) forest of the northeastern U.S. and southeastern Canada and of boreal forest at least as far north as the Island of Newfoundland. Commonly it is found in coniferous and deciduous forests or open lush green grasslands.

Toxicity
The species is considered inedible and possibly poisonous.

See also

List of Amanita species

References

External links

albocreata
Fungi of Canada
Fungi of the United States
Fungi described in 1902
Fungi of North America
Fungi without expected TNC conservation status